Zeynep Akata is a professor of computer science at the University of Tübingen where she leads the Explainable Machine Learning group. Akata is also a Senior Research Scientist at the Max Planck Institute for Intelligent Systems, Tübingen.

Education and career 
Akata received her Ph.D. in computer science at the INRIA Grenoble-Rhônes-Alpes. She was a post-doctoral research fellow at the Max Planck Institute for Informatics with Bernt Schiele and at University of California, Berkeley with Trevor Darrell. Akata was an assistant professor at the University of Amsterdam from 2017 to 2019 before joining the University of Tübingen in 2019.

Research 
Akata's research interests focus on explainable machine learning, multi-modal learning, and low-shot learning.

Selected awards and honours 
 2021 German Pattern Recognition Award
 2019 ERC Starting Grant
 2019 Young Scientist Honour from the Werner-von-Siemens-Ring foundation
 2014 Lise-Meitner Award for Excellent Women in Computer Science from the Max Planck Society

References 

Computer vision researchers
Living people
Turkish scientists
Year of birth missing (living people)